Gledswood Hills is a suburb of the Macarthur Region of Sydney in the state of New South Wales, Australia in Camden Council. The suburb name was assigned on 9 December 2011. The suburb was named after the 1830 Gledswood Homestead.

Heritage listings
Gledswood Hills has a number of heritage-listed sites, including:
 900 Camden Valley Way: Gledswood
Channon street

References